Francis Leonard Hugh Mooney (26 May 1921 – 8 March 2004) was a New Zealand cricketer who played in 14 Test matches as a wicket-keeper between 1949 and 1954.

He played for Wellington from 1941–42 to 1954–55, and toured England in 1949 and South Africa in 1953–54.

References

External links

 

1921 births
2004 deaths
New Zealand Test cricketers
Wellington cricketers
North Island cricketers
Wicket-keepers